St Magnus Church, St Magnus' Church or St Magnus's Church may refer to one of several churches dedicated to a St Magnus:

Magnus of Anagni
Santi Michele e Magno, Rome
Magnus of Füssen
St. Mang's Abbey, Füssen
Magnuskirche, Worms
Magnus the Martyr
St Magnus-the-Martyr, London
St Magnus Cathedral, Kirkwall, Orkney
St Magnus Church, Egilsay, Orkney
Orphir Roundchurch, Orphir, Orkney